The Junior men's race at the 2006 IAAF World Cross Country Championships was held at the Umi-no-nakamichi Seaside Park in Fukuoka, Japan, on April 2, 2006.  Reports of the event were given in The New York Times, and for the IAAF.

Complete results for individuals, for teams, medallists, and the results of British athletes who took part were published.

Race results

Junior men's race (8 km)

Individual

†: Thomas Longosiwa of  originally finished 13th in 24:25 and Tareq Taher of  originally finished 20th in 24:49, but were disqualified for age falsification.

Teams

Note: Athletes in parentheses did not score for the team result.

Participation
According to an unofficial count, 98 athletes from 29 countries participated in the Junior men's race.  This is in agreement with the official numbers as published.

 (1)
 (1)
 (5)
 (1)
 (4)
 (2)
 (6)
 (4)
 (5)
 (1)
 (6)
 (6)
 (1)
 (6)
 (2)
 (6)
 (4)
 (2)
 (4)
 (2)
 (3)
 (1)
 (6)
 (1)
 (1)
 (4)
 (6)
 (6)
 (1)

See also
 2006 IAAF World Cross Country Championships – Senior men's race
 2006 IAAF World Cross Country Championships – Men's short race
 2006 IAAF World Cross Country Championships – Senior women's race
 2006 IAAF World Cross Country Championships – Women's short race
 2006 IAAF World Cross Country Championships – Junior women's race

References

Junior men's race at the World Athletics Cross Country Championships
IAAF World Cross Country Championships
2006 in youth sport